WHO AM I is an upcoming Indian Hindi film starring Chetan Sharma and Rishika Chandani. The film is much appreciated in the International film festivals globally is releasing on 3rd Feb 2023.

Production
Produced under the banner of Write Click Production, WHO AM I is a philosophical drama, The story of this film is based on the critically acclaimed novel "Ko Aham" by Ashok Jamnani. Kallol Mukherjee has written the adapted screenplay and dialogues. Shirish Prakash is the Producer and Shireesh Khemariya is the Director of this film. The film has been entirely shot in Madhya Pradesh - Amarkantak, Dindori, Gadarwara and Narmadapuram which shows the untouched beauty of Madhya Pradesh.

Synopsis
Bhavitavya, a philosophy student, is full of questions about life. When his favourite professor passes away, Bhavitavya embarks on a journey of self-discovery, wondering who he is and what his life means. Shot on the banks of the Narmada River, Who Am I is a picturesque examination of the human condition. This film is a philosophical drama that revolves around Narmada parikrama.

Cast
 Chetan Sharma as Bhavitavya/Sadanand 
 Surendra Rajan as Swami ji 
 Rishika Chandani as Aditi 
 Shashie Verma as V.L.N sir

References

External links
 Who Am I
 Who Am I
 Who Am I Movie: Review | Release Date (2023) | Songs | Music | Images | Official Trailers | Videos | Photos | News - Bollywood Hungama

Upcoming films
Hindi-language drama films
Indian drama films
2023 drama films
2023 films
Upcoming Hindi-language films
Upcoming Indian films